FK Radnički (formerly FK Radnički Stobex, Serbian Cyrillic: ФК Раднички Стобекс) is a football club based in Klupci, Serbia. They currently play in the Kolubara-Mačva Zone League, a fourth tier in Serbia's football league, and spent the 2001–02 and 2002–03 seasons in the Serbian First League. The club also finished in second place in the third division in 2009, but lost the zonal promotion play-off to FK Radnički Sombor.

The club's former name stems from their owners, the gravel company Stobex.

The club currently participates in the regional leagues.

References

Football clubs in Serbia
Association football clubs established in 1948
1948 establishments in Serbia